This is a list of the champions of the International Fight League.

IFL Champions

Heavyweight Championship
Weight limit: Unlimited

Light Heavyweight Championship
Weight limit:

Middleweight Championship
Weight limit:

Welterweight Championship
Weight limit:

Lightweight Championship
Weight limit:

Featherweight Championbship
Weight limit: 

International Fight League
Mixed martial arts champions
International Fight League Champions, List Of
ja:International Fight League
simple:International Fight League
sv:International Fight League